Bata Falcons are a team from Montserrat founded in 1974 and are currently one of the most successful teams in Montserrat.

Honours
Barclays Knockout Trophy-1974

Montserrat Championship-1975

History
Montserrat 1974
League: Police
Cup final (Barclays Knockout Trophy): Bata Falcons 2-0 Kinsale

In 1975 Bata Falcons also won the Montserrat Championship for the first time and only time in the club's history. They became the second team to ever win the championship after the Montserrat police force the year before them.

Montserrat - List of Champions

Football came to Montserrat in post-war years and grew in the late 60s and 70s when a league and FA were set up.

1974       Police

1975       Bata Falcons

1976-95      not known

1995/96    Royal Montserrat Police Force

1996/97      abandoned

1998-99      no championship

2000       Royal Montserrat Police Force

2001       Royal Montserrat Police Force

2002/03    Royal Montserrat Police Force

2004       Ideal SC

References

 
Salem, Montserrat
Association football clubs established in 1974